Giovanni Santi (c. 1435 – 1 August 1494) was an Italian painter, decorator, and the father of Raphael. He was born in 1435 at Colbordolo in the Duchy of Urbino. He studied under Piero della Francesca and was influenced by Fiorenzo di Lorenzo. He was court painter to the Duke of Urbino and painted several altarpieces. He died in Urbino.

Life and painting
Santi was born in 1435 at Colbordolo in the Duchy of Urbino. He was a petty merchant for a time; he then studied under Piero della Francesca. He was influenced by Fiorenzo di Lorenzo, and seems to have been an assistant and friend of Melozzo da Forlì. He was court painter to Duke of Urbino Federico da Montefeltro and painted several altarpieces, two now in the Berlin Museum, a Madonna in the church of San Francesco in Urbino, one at the church of Santa Croce in Fano, one in the National Gallery at London, and another in the gallery at Urbino; an Annunciation at the Brera in Milan; a resurrected Christ in the Museum of Fine Arts, Budapest; and a Jerome in the Lateran.

The reputation of the court had been established by Federico da Montefeltro. The emphasis of Federico's court was more literary than artistic, but Santi was a poet of sorts as well as a painter, and had written a rhymed chronicle of the life of Federico, and both wrote the texts and produced the decor for masque-like court entertainments. His poem to Federico shows him as keen to show awareness of the most advanced North Italian painters, and Early Netherlandish artists as well. In the very small court of Urbino he was probably more integrated into the central circle of the ruling family than most court painters.

Federico, who died in 1482, was succeeded by his son Guidobaldo da Montefeltro, who married Elisabetta Gonzaga. Under them, the court continued as a centre for literary culture. In 1483, Santi's son Raphael was born. Santi died in Urbino in 1494.

Poetry and list of 15th-century painters
His poetry includes an epic in honor of one of his patrons, Federico da Montefeltro, followed by a discourse on painting. The event commemorates a visit to Mantua, where the Duke marveled at the skill of Andrea Mantegna, he then goes on to comment that "In this splendid and gentle art/ so many have been famous in our century/ that it make others seem destitute".

Santi then goes on to list famous names in painting, as known to him, this constitutes a remarkable concise list of 27 prominent painters of late 15th-century Italy and the Flanders, as one painter would have known. Santi's list reproduced in no order:

 Fra Angelico
 Domenico Ghirlandaio
 Piero and Antonio del Pollaiuolo
 Sandro Botticelli
 Leonardo da Vinci
 Filippino Lippi
 Pietro Perugino
 Luca Signorelli
 Gentile Bellini
 Giovanni Bellini
 Andrea Mantegna
 Andrea del Castagno
 Cosimo Tura
 Piero della Francesca
 Ercole de' Roberti
 Francesco di Pesello or Pesellino
 Masaccio
 Paolo Uccello
 Pisanello
 Domenico Veneziano
 Melozzo da Forlì
 Gentile da Fabriano
 Antonello da Messina
 Jan van Eyck
 Rogier van der Weyden

References

Further reading
Schmarsow, Giovanni Santi (Berlin, 1887)
Poetry and list derived from Painting and Experience in Fifteenth Century Italy. Michael Baxandall. Oxford University Press 1980.

External links

Giovanni Santi at Panopticon Virtual Art Gallery
The Gubbio Studiolo and its conservation, volumes 1 & 2, from The Metropolitan Museum of Art Libraries (fully available online as PDF), which contains material on Giovanni Santi (see index)

Italian Renaissance painters
Court painters
1435 births
1494 deaths
People from the Province of Pesaro and Urbino
15th-century Italian painters
Italian male painters
Raphael